Carl Lombé (born 18 May 1986 in Yaoundé) is a Cameroonian–Armenian footballer who played for Cypriot side Aris Limassol F.C.

Despite being capped for Armenia at youth level, he is still eligible to play for Cameroon as he never played for Armenia in the senior team.

Biography
Lombé moved to Armenia in 2002 and signed a contract with Pyunik FC in March 2003. In 2005, he joined Rapid București along with Apoula Edel by unilaterally terminated his contract without just reason. Pyunik FC submitted the case to FIFA Dispute Resolution Chamber, which the DRC passed a decision on 4 April 2007 and sent the decision to the parties on 3 August, which Lombé was ordered to pay Pyunik US$15,000. He also claimed he was forced to naturalise in the court as an excuse to leave the country in 2005. The parties submitted the appeal to the Court of Arbitration for Sport and CAS partially upheld the DRC decision and increased the fee to US$25,000 in 2008.

References

External links
 

1986 births
Living people
Cameroonian footballers
Cameroonian expatriate footballers
Armenian footballers
Armenia under-21 international footballers
Association football midfielders
Footballers from Yaoundé
FC Pyunik players
FC Rapid București players
SV Wehen Wiesbaden players
Aris Limassol FC players
2. Bundesliga players
Cypriot First Division players
Cypriot Second Division players
Expatriate footballers in Germany
Expatriate footballers in Romania
Expatriate footballers in Cyprus
Armenian Premier League players
Cameroonian emigrants to Armenia